Marioni is a surname that may refer to:

Bruno Marioni (born Bruno Giménez, 1975), retired Argentine striker
Dante Marioni (born 1964), American glass artist
John Marioni, computational biologist, Head of Research at the European Bioinformatics Institute
Paul Marioni (born 1941), American artist
Tom Marioni (born 1937), American artist and educator